A yield surface is a five-dimensional surface in the six-dimensional space of stresses.  The yield surface is usually convex and the state of stress of inside the yield surface is elastic.  When the stress state lies on the surface the material is said to have reached its yield point and the material is said to have become plastic.  Further deformation of the material causes the stress state to remain on the yield surface, even though the shape and size of the surface may change as the plastic deformation evolves. This is because stress states that lie outside the yield surface are non-permissible in rate-independent plasticity, though not in some models of viscoplasticity.

The yield surface is usually expressed in terms of (and visualized in) a three-dimensional principal stress space, a two- or three-dimensional space spanned by stress invariants or a version of the three-dimensional Haigh–Westergaard stress space. Thus we may write the equation of the yield surface (that is, the yield function) in the forms:

 where  are the principal stresses.

Invariants used to describe yield surfaces 

The first principal invariant of the Cauchy stress, and the second and third principal invariants of the deviatoric part of the Cauchy stress are defined as:

where  is the identity matrix.

A related set of quantities,, are usually used to describe yield surfaces for cohesive frictional materials such as rocks, soils, and ceramics.  These are defined as

where  is the equivalent stress.

These are defined as:

The  plane is also called the Rendulic plane.

The principal stresses and the Haigh–Westergaard coordinates are related by

A different definition of the Lode angle can also be found in the literature:

in which case the ordered principal stresses (where ) are related by

Examples of yield surfaces 

There are several different yield surfaces known in engineering, and those most popular are listed below.

Tresca yield surface 
The Tresca yield criterion is taken to be the work of Henri Tresca. It is also known as the maximum shear stress theory (MSST) and the Tresca–Guest (TG) criterion.  In terms of the principal stresses the Tresca criterion is expressed as

Figure 1 shows the Tresca–Guest yield surface in the three-dimensional space of principal stresses. It is a prism of six sides and having infinite length. This means that the material remains elastic when all three principal stresses are roughly equivalent (a hydrostatic pressure), no matter how much it is compressed or stretched. However, when one of the principal stresses becomes smaller (or larger) than the others the material is subject to shearing.  In such situations, if the shear stress reaches the yield limit then the material enters the plastic domain.  Figure 2 shows the Tresca–Guest yield surface in two-dimensional stress space, it is a cross section of the prism along the  plane.

von Mises yield surface 

The von Mises yield criterion is expressed in the principal stresses as

where  is the yield strength in uniaxial tension.

Figure 3 shows the von Mises yield surface in the three-dimensional space of principal stresses. It is a circular cylinder of infinite length with its axis inclined at equal angles to the three principal stresses. Figure 4 shows the von Mises yield surface in two-dimensional space compared with Tresca–Guest criterion.  A cross section of the von Mises cylinder on the plane of  produces the elliptical shape of the yield surface.

Burzyński-Yagn criterion
This criterion

represents the general equation of a second order surface of revolution about the hydrostatic axis. Some special case are:

 cylinder  (Maxwell (1865), Huber (1904), von Mises (1913),  Hencky (1924)),
 cone  (Botkin (1940), Drucker-Prager (1952), Mirolyubov (1953)),
 paraboloid  (Burzyński (1928), Balandin (1937), Torre (1947)),
 ellipsoid centered of symmetry plane ,   (Beltrami (1885)),
 hyperboloid of two sheets  (Burzynski (1928), Yagn (1931)),
 hyperboloid of one sheet ,    (Filonenko-Boroditsch (1960), Gol’denblat-Kopnov (1968), Filin (1975)).

The relations compression-tension and torsion-tension can be computed to

The Poisson's ratios at tension and compression are obtained using

For ductile materials the restriction

is important. The application of rotationally symmetric criteria for brittle failure with

has not been studied sufficiently.

The Burzyński-Yagn criterion is well suited for academic purposes. For practical applications, the third invariant of the deviator in the odd and even power should be introduced in the equation, e.g.:

Huber criterion
The Huber criterion consists of the Beltrami ellipsoid and a scaled von Mises cylinder in the principal stress space, see also

The transition between the surfaces in the cross section  is continuously differentiable.
The criterion represents the "classical view" with respect to inelastic material behavior:

The modified Huber criterion, see also, cf. 

consists of the Schleicher ellipsoid with the restriction of Poisson's ratio at compression

and a cylinder with the -transition in the cross section . 
The second setting for the parameters  and  follows with the compression / tension relation

The modified Huber criterion can be better fitted to the measured data as the Huber criterion.

The Huber criterion and the modified Huber criterion should be preferred to the von Mises criterion since one obtains safer results in the region .
For practical applications the third invariant of the deviator  should be considered in these criteria.

Mohr–Coulomb yield surface

The Mohr–Coulomb yield (failure) criterion is similar to the Tresca criterion, with additional provisions for materials with different tensile and compressive yield strengths.  This model is often used to model concrete, soil or granular materials. The Mohr–Coulomb yield criterion may be expressed as:

where

The formula reduces to the Tresca criterion if .

Figure 5 shows Mohr–Coulomb yield surface in the three-dimensional space of principal stresses. It is a conical prism and  determines the inclination angle of conical surface. Figure 6 shows Mohr–Coulomb yield surface in two-dimensional stress space. In Figure 6 Rr and Rc are used for Syc and Syt, respectively, in the formula.

Drucker–Prager yield surface

The Drucker–Prager yield criterion is similar to the von Mises yield criterion, with provisions for handling materials with differing tensile and compressive yield strengths. This criterion is most often used for concrete where both normal and shear stresses can determine failure. The Drucker–Prager yield criterion may be expressed as

where

The formula reduces to the von Mises equation if .

Figure 7 shows Drucker–Prager yield surface in the three-dimensional space of principal stresses. It is a regular cone. Figure 8 shows Drucker–Prager yield surface in two-dimensional space. One choice is to intersect the Mohr–Coulomb yield surface at three vertices on either side of the  line, but usually selected by convention to be those in the compression regime. Another choice is to intersect the Mohr–Coulomb yield surface at four vertices on both axes (uniaxial fit) or at two vertices on the diagonal  (biaxial fit). The Drucker-Prager yield criterion is also commonly expressed in terms of the material cohesion and friction angle.

Bresler–Pister yield surface

The Bresler–Pister yield criterion is an extension of the Drucker Prager yield criterion that uses three parameters, and has additional terms for materials that yield under hydrostatic compression.
In terms of the principal stresses, this yield criterion may be expressed as

where  are material constants. The additional parameter  gives the yield surface an ellipsoidal cross section when viewed from a direction perpendicular to its axis.

Willam–Warnke yield surface

The Willam–Warnke yield criterion is a three-parameter smoothed version of the Mohr–Coulomb yield criterion that has similarities in form to the Drucker–Prager and Bresler–Pister yield criteria.

The yield criterion has the functional form

However, it is more commonly expressed in Haigh–Westergaard coordinates as

The cross-section of the surface when viewed along its axis is a smoothed triangle (unlike Mohr–Coulomb). The Willam–Warnke yield surface is convex and has unique and well defined first and second derivatives on every point of its surface. Therefore, the Willam–Warnke model is computationally robust and has been used for a variety of cohesive-frictional materials.

Podgórski and Rosendahl trigonometric yield surfaces 
Normalized with respect to the uniaxial tensile stress , the Podgórski criterion   as function of the stress angle  reads

with the shape function of trigonal symmetry in the -plane

The isogonal (equiangular) hexagons of the Haythornthwaite criterion  containing the Schmidt-Ishlinsky criterion (regular hexagon) cannot be described with the Podgórski ctiterion.

The Rosendahl criterion  reads

with the shape function of hexagonal symmetry in the -plane

The isogonal dodecagons of the multiplicative ansatz criterion of hexagonal symmetry  containing the Ishlinsky-Ivlev criterion (regular dodecagon) cannot be described by the Rosendahl criterion.

The criteria of Podgórski and Rosendahl describe single surfaces in principal stress space without any additional outer contours and plane intersections. The generalization in the form  is relevant for theoretical investigations.

A pressure-sensitive extension of the criteria can be obtained with the linear -substitution 

which is sufficient for many applications, e.g. metals, cast iron, alloys, concrete, unreinforced polymers, etc.

Bigoni–Piccolroaz yield surface
The Bigoni–Piccolroaz yield criterion is a seven-parameter surface defined by

where  is the "meridian" function

describing the Lode-dependence of yielding. The seven, non-negative material parameters:

define the shape of the meridian and deviatoric sections.

This criterion represents a smooth and convex surface, which is closed both in hydrostatic tension and compression and has a 
drop-like shape, particularly suited to describe frictional and granular materials. This criterion has also been generalized to the case of surfaces with corners.

Cosine Ansatz (Altenbach-Bolchoun-Kolupaev) 
For the formulation of the strength criteria the stress angle

can be used.

The following criterion of isotropic material behavior

contains a number of other well-known less general criteria, provided suitable parameter values are chosen.

Parameters  and  describe the geometry of the surface in the -plane. They are subject to the constraints

which follow from the convexity condition. A more precise formulation of the third constraints is proposed in.

Parameters  and  describe the position of the intersection points of the yield surface with hydrostatic axis (space diagonal in the principal stress space). These intersections points are called hydrostatic nodes.
In the case of materials which do not fail at hydrostatic pressure (steel, brass, etc.) one gets . Otherwise for materials which fail at hydrostatic pressure (hard foams, ceramics, sintered materials, etc.) it follows .

Barlat's Yield Surface  
For the anisotropic materials, depending on the direction of the applied process (e.g., rolling) the mechanical properties vary and, therefore, using an anisotropic yield function is crucial. Since 1989 Frederic Barlat has developed a family of yield functions for constitutive modelling of plastic anisotropy. Among them, Yld2000-2D yield criteria has been applied for a wide range of sheet metals (e.g., aluminum alloys and advanced high-strength steels). The Yld2000-2D model is a non-quadratic type yield function based on two linear transformation of the stress tensor:
 :

 where s is the deviatoric stress tensor.
for principal values of X’ and X”, the model could be expressed as: 

and:

where  are eight parameters of the Barlat's Yld2000-2D model to be identified with a set of experiments.

See also

 Yield (engineering)
 Plasticity (physics)
 Stress
 Henri Tresca
 von Mises stress
 Mohr–Coulomb theory
 Hill yield criterion
 Hosford yield criterion
 Strain
 Strain tensor
 Stress–energy tensor
 Stress concentration
 3-D elasticity
 Frederic Barlat

References 

Plasticity (physics)
Solid mechanics
Continuum mechanics
Materials science
Structural analysis